Majed Al-Qahtani (born September 13, 1990) is a Saudi football player who plays for Al-Taraf as a winger.

References

1990 births
Living people
Saudi Arabian footballers
Hajer FC players
Al-Adalah FC players
Al Oyoon FC players
Al-Rawdhah Club players
Al-Taraf Club players
Saudi Second Division players
Saudi First Division League players
Saudi Professional League players
Saudi Fourth Division players
Association football fullbacks
Association football wingers